Perfect 10, Inc. v. Visa Int'l Serv. Ass'n is a court case in which the pornography magazine Perfect 10 filed a complaint against Visa and MasterCard for copyright infringement and trademark infringement.

Background 

Perfect 10 is a pornography magazine publisher that also markets online subscriptions to www.perfect10.com.  Both its magazine and its website feature copyrighted images of nude models.  Perfect 10 holds federal copyrights to the photographs published in its magazine and website.  Perfect 10 also holds federal trademark rights to the use of the term, "PERFECT 10," which prohibits other websites or agencies from using the term.

Timeline of the trial

Lawsuits filed against financial institutions 

Perfect 10 claimed that many websites have stolen its copyrighted images, misrepresented themselves as if they were affiliated with Perfect 10, and offered the stolen images for sale on the internet.  Perfect 10 alleges that the stolen-content websites are engaged in direct copyright infringement.

However, Perfect 10 did not directly sue the stolen-content websites. Instead, Perfect 10 sued the financial institutions which process credit card payments to these websites. This is similar to a past lawsuit Perfect 10, Inc. v. Google Inc. in which Google was sued for its search engine popping up results with the stolen-content websites.

In this case, Perfect 10 sued Visa International, MasterCard International, and several affiliated banks and data processing services, alleging secondary liability under federal copyright and trademark law, secondary liability under California statutory and common law, and violations of California laws proscribing unfair competition and false advertising.

Initial dismissal by US District Court 
Initially, the United States District Court for the Northern District of California dismissed the case.  Perfect 10 appealed to the United States Court of Appeals for the Ninth Circuit.

Perfect 10's Appeal: Secondary Liability for Copyright Infringement 

Perfect 10 appealed the district court's decision, maintaining that Defendants were guilty of contributory copyright infringement and vicarious copyright infringement.  Direct infringement under the Copyright Act, 17 U.S.C. § 101 would apply only to the stolen-content websites.  In helping these websites process payments, however, the defendants were allegedly contributing to infringement.

Contributory copyright infringement 

Since contributory copyright infringement is a secondary liability and distinguishable from direct infringement, Visa could be indicted as a contributory infringer if it had knowledge of the infringing activity of the stolen-content websites, and if it induced or materially contributed to the infringement.  The court found the defendants not liable for contributory copyright infringement, because payment processing services do not constitute material contribution to the direct infringement.  This is the finding of the majority, although there is much dissent as to what constitutes material contribution.

Material contribution 

Perfect 10 argued that Defendants had chosen to continue to process credit card payments to the infringing websites, despite having knowledge of ongoing infringement.  Perfect 10 argued that the defendants induce, enable, and contribute to the infringing activity of stolen-content websites by persisting in providing payment services and facilities.  Perfect 10 drew analogies from prior cases: Fonovisa, A&M Records, Inc. v. Napster, Inc. and MGM v. Grokster.  In Fonovisa, the defendant-appellee was accused of providing the "site and facilities" for infringement in the form of a swap meet that allowed infringing activity to take place on a large scale and for infringement to be profitable.  The Fonovisa court held that the infringers and the swap meet providers were in a mutual enterprise of infringement, and the swap meet providers encouraged infringement, which altogether constituted material contribution and inducement.  Perfect 10 argued that Visa was the cyberspace equivalent of such an illicit marketplace, and that without the material contribution of Visa's payment process system, infringement could not have happened on a large scale.

The court decided that infringement rests on reproduction, alteration, display, and distribution of Perfect 10's images over the Internet.  It argued that Visa and its payment processing services were not designed to reproduce or alter copyrighted images.  Even if users could not pay for images with credit cards, infringement could still continue on a large scale because other viable funding mechanisms were available.

Inducement 

In MGM v. Grokster, the court found that "one who distributes a device with the object of promoting its use to infringe copyright, as shown by clear expression or other affirmative steps taken to foster infringement, is liable for the resulting acts of infringement by third parties."  Perfect 10 argued that the defendants induce customers to use their credit cards to purchase goods and services from infringing websites, and are therefore guilty of inducement of infringement.

The court made the distinction that the software system in A&M Records, Inc. v. Napster, Inc. and MGM Studios, Inc. v. Grokster, Ltd. were engineered and promoted explicitly for the purpose of facilitating infringement of copyrighted music, thereby reducing legitimate sales of such music.  In contrast, the defendant's system did not facilitate access to infringing websites.  Again, the defendants did not use its payment process system to copy, alter, distribute, or display infringing material.  Consumers did not use Visa to locate, view, or download the infringing images.  Thus, the court held that infringing websites simply use the defendants' system to process payments.

In addition, the court ruled that there was no evidence to suggest that the defendants engineered its payment processing system with the intent of promoting its use for infringement because its device was designed to process payment of any type of sales transacted on cyberspace.

The court also held that no facts suggested that the defendants promoted their payment system as a means to infringe, so inducement could not be established.

Vicarious copyright infringement 

Vicarious copyright infringement is established if Defendants have both the right and ability to supervise the infringing conduct and a direct financial interest in the infringing activity.  In this case, Perfect 10 alleged that the defendants had an indirect right and ability to control the content of the infringing websites by refusing to process credit card payments to the websites.

The court ruled that the defendants could block access to their payment system, but they could not block access to the Internet, and therefore could not block access to the infringing websites nor to the search engines that enabled their discovery.  In other words, since the defendants could not directly supervise infringing conduct, they did not have the right and ability to control content, and vicarious infringement could not be established.

Secondary liability for trademark infringement 

There are two kinds of secondary liability for trademark infringement:  Contributory trademark infringement and vicarious trademark infringement.  While trademark infringement is different from copyright infringement, Perfect 10's arguments in support of trademark infringement were essentially identical to those alleged in Perfect 10's copyright claims, so the court ruled they were not liable for trademark infringement.

Contributory trademark infringement 

To be liable for contributory trademark infringement, the defendants would have had to have intentionally induced the primary infringer to infringe, or continued to supply an infringing product to an infringer with knowledge that the infringer is mislabeling the particular product supplied." Inwood Labs., Inc. v. Ives Labs., Inc., 456 U.S. 844, 855 (1982).

Perfect 10 alleged that the defendants played a critical role within the stolen-content websites' cycle of business that allowed the direct infringers to be profitable.  They also claimed that the websites were using the PERFECT 10 mark in a manner likely to cause the public to believe that these stolen-content websites were authorized by Perfect 10.  Perfect 10 continued by saying that Visa can choose to stop processing payments to these websites, which might have the practical effect of stopping or reducing the infringing activity.

The defendant's payment processing system was not an infringing product in itself, nor was it designed to intentionally induce trademark infringement, so contributory trademark infringement was not established.

Vicarious trademark infringement 

Vicarious liability for trademark infringement requires "a finding that the defendant and the infringer have an apparent or actual partnership, have authority to bind one another in transactions with third parties or exercise joint ownership or control over the infringing product." Hard Rock Café Licensing Corp. v. Concession Servs., Inc., 955 F.2d 1143, 1150.

The court found that defendants only processed payments to these websites and collected their usual processing fees, which did not constitute joint ownership.  It is the websites’ contracts with the consumers that bind the websites to provide the infringing images, not the websites’ relationship with Defendants.

See also 
 Secondary liability
 List of leading legal cases in copyright law
 MGM v. Grokster
 Perfect 10 v. Google
 A&M Records, Inc. v. Napster, Inc.

External links 
 Text of the court ruling
  Jane Ginsburg, An introduction of secondary liability for copyright infringement by Professor Jane Ginsburg (March, 2006)
  Jane Coleman,  Secondary Trademark Infringement: A Short Treatise on Contributory and Vicarious Infringement in Trademark (Revised, Sept. 2010).

United States copyright case law
United States Internet case law
2007 in United States case law
Perfect 10 (magazine) litigation